Sir John Anthony Plowman (27 December 1905 – 30 August 1993) was a British judge who served as the Vice-Chancellor of the Chancery Division of the High Court between 1974 and 1976.

Biography 
The son of John Tharp Plowman, a solicitor, Plowman was educated at the Highgate School before taking the Law Society examinations, with a view of becoming a solicitor. He then attended Gonville and Caius College, Cambridge, graduating with a First. He was called to the bar by Lincoln's Inn in 1931 and practised at the Chancery bar. During World War II, he joined the Royal Air Force, attaining the rank of Squadron leader.

After the War, Plowman returned to the bar, and was made a Queen's Counsel in 1954. He was appointed to the High Court in 1961 and assigned to the Chancery Division, receiving the customary knighthood. He became Vice-Chancellor in 1974, serving until his retirement in 1976.

Plowman was a Member of the General Council of the Bar between 1956 and 1960 and was elected a bencher of Lincoln's Inn shortly before his appointment to the bench in 1961. He married Vernon Graham in 1933; they had three daughters. Lady Plowman died in 1988.

Arms

References 

1905 births
1993 deaths
People educated at Highgate School
Alumni of Gonville and Caius College, Cambridge
Members of Lincoln's Inn
Royal Air Force officers
Royal Air Force pilots of World War II
English King's Counsel
Chancery Division judges
Knights Bachelor
20th-century English lawyers